is a Japanese actress. Her television roles have included the young Haruko Amano in the 2013 NHK asadora Amachan and the lead role in the 2017 asadora Hiyokko. She has also appeared in several films, including Flying Colors, for which she won a 39th Japan Academy Film Prize for Newcomer of the Year, and We Made A Beautiful Bouquet, for which she won the 45th Japan Academy Film Prize for Best Actress.

Early life

Arimura was born on February 13, 1993, in Hyōgo Prefecture, Japan. She has an older sister, Airi Arimura, who also became an actress and a model.

Career

In December 2009, while attending Hyogo Prefectural Itami Nishi High School, Arimura auditioned for FLaMme and passed. In May 2010, she made her first series appearance in Hagane no Onna. Arimura gained popularity by appearing in the Morning drama Amachan in 2013. Arimura then appeared as the lead actress in the critically acclaimed film Flying Colors where she was cast as a troubled teen who attends a cram school at the behest of her mother in order to gain entry to University. The film was a massive box office success and was the 8th highest-grossing film in Japan in 2015. Arimura was nominated for both the Outstanding Performance By An Actress In A Leading Role and Newcomer of the Year Awards in the 39th Japan Academy Film Prize for her role in the film. She was awarded the Newcomer of the Year Award.

Arimura was selected as the lead actress for the Asadora Hiyokko in the year 2017. For her role in the drama, she was voted as the Best Actress in The 94th Television Drama Academy Awards (2017), an award given quarterly by a popular Japanese magazine, The Television, and are based on the combined results of votes from the magazine readers, juries, and TV journalists in Japan. She has since appeared in many critically acclaimed television dramas and films such as Chūgakusei Nikki, I Am a Hero, Cafe Funiculi Funicula and Sekigahara. In the film Sekigahara, Arimura played the role of a ninja named Hatsume who was recruited by the legendary samurai Ishida Mitsunari. The film was nominated for the Picture of the Year award at the 41st Japan Academy Film Prize. 

Arimura has also taken on acting roles in works which are regarded as controversial in nature. In the drama Chūgakusei Nikki, Arimura took on the challenging role of a young teacher who ended up falling in love with her 15 year-old student. Despite its controversial nature, the drama was named the Best Drama in the 99th Japan Television Drama Academy Awards.

The year 2021 proved to be a very successful year for Arimura. She appeared in the film We Made A Beautiful Bouquet, which was the 8th highest grossing film of 2021 in Japan. Arimura was awarded the Best Actress award in the 45th Japan Academy Film Prize for her role in the film. Arimura also starred in the blockbuster films Rurouni Kenshin: The Final and Rurouni Kenshin: The Beginning, the final 2 films of the epic Rurouni Kenshin film franchise which consist of films which are adapted from the Rurouni Kenshin manga series. Both films were massive box-office successes in 2021 in Japan, grossing more than 6.5 billion yen cumulatively. Arimura portrayed Yukishiro Tomoe, the deceased-wife of the titular character Himura Kenshin. Rurouni Kenshin: The Final was the 6th highest grossing film whilst Rurouni Kenshin: The Beginning was the 13th highest grossing film for the year 2021 in Japan.

On the drama side, Arimura starred as a young lady struggling with employment, who happens to chance upon a group of also struggling stand-up comedians in the 2021 slice of life drama Life's Punchline (Konto Ga Hajimaru). For her role in the drama, she was voted as the Best Supporting Actress in The 108th Television Drama Academy Awards, making her one of the few female actresses who has won both the Best Actress (Hiyokko) and Best Supporting Actress Awards (Life's Punchline) in The Television Drama Academy Awards.

Arimura appeared in the drama Zenkamono (a.k.a Prior Convictions) wherein she acted as a voluntary probation officer who was tasked with the supervision of 3 separate paroled convicts. A movie version of Zenkamono starring Arimura was also released in 2022. Also In 2022, Arimura appeared alongside Ninomiya Kazunari in the TV Special Adventure of Comandante Cappellini (Sensuikan Cappellini-go no Bouken) and starred in the drama Ishiko and Haneo. Arimura appeared in the film Phases of the Moon in December 2022.

In January 2023, Arimura appeared in the 62nd NHK taiga drama What Will You Do, Ieyasu?. In February, Kasumi starred in the Netflix-produced film titled Call Me Chihiro.

Filmography

Movies

TV dramas

Stage
 Jeanne d'Arc (7 October 2014 - 24 November 2014), Jeanne d'Arc
 Tomodachi (2021), the second daughter

Video games
 Layton's Mystery Journey (2017), Katrielle "Kat" Layton

Music videos
 Ketsumeishi - Nakama (12 May 2010)
 Sayaka Shionoya - Dear Heaven (10 December 2012)
 Saku - Start Me Up (29 April 2015)
 Aoi Teshima - Letter for Tomorrow (10 February 2016)
 Nissy - Happening and My Prettiest Girl (24 August 2016)

Others
66th NHK Kōhaku Uta Gassen (2015), a judge
67th NHK Kōhaku Uta Gassen (2016), red team captain
68th NHK Kōhaku Uta Gassen (2017), red team captain
64th Japan Record Awards (2022), host

Bibliography

Books
 Kimi to Boku no Heya (Shueisha, 20 March 2015), cover,

Photobooks
 B.L.T. U-17 Vol.17 (Tokyo News Mook) (5 February 2011), Tokyo News Service, 
 aBUTTON Vol.4_Yume Arimura Kasumi (Plup Series) (30 November 2011), Parco, 
 Shinkokyū: Shin Kokyu (7 November 2013), Shueisha, 
 Oh! My Rody (14 February 2014), TMWC,

Awards

References

External links

Kasumi Arimura at FLaMme 
 Official blog 
 

1993 births
Living people
Asadora lead actors
Japanese television actresses
Japanese television personalities
Japanese video game actresses
Japanese voice actresses
People from Itami, Hyōgo
Voice actresses from Hyōgo Prefecture
21st-century Japanese actresses